Kamionna may refer to the following places in Poland:
Kamionna, Lower Silesian Voivodeship (south-west Poland)
Kamionna, Lesser Poland Voivodeship (south Poland)
Kamionna, Pułtusk County in Masovian Voivodeship (east-central Poland)
Kamionna, Węgrów County in Masovian Voivodeship (east-central Poland)
Kamionna, Greater Poland Voivodeship (west-central Poland)